Dhakoli is a town in the municipality of Zirakpur, Mohali District, Punjab, India (also old village Dhakuli). It was incorporated in the municipality in 1999.

Dhakoli has been an ever developing area with residential and commercial projects springing up every now and then. It is home to many luxurious and posh societies with proper roads and uninterrupted water and electricity supply. The area has seen tremendous improvement in the past few years.

The town contains many plush hotels and planned societies.

Societies
 Dee Ess Estates
 Golden Sand Apartments
 Guru Nanak Enclave
 Guru Nanak Colony
 Gulmohar Avenue
 Green City
 Green Valley Apartments
 Hill View Enclave
 Ivory Enclave
 Jagriti Apartments  
 Krishna Enclave
 MS Enclave
 Maple Apartments
 Motia Huys
 Motia Heights Apartments
 Pine Homes
 Rehmat Homes
 Saraswati Vihar
 Shri Ganesh Vihar
 Savitri Greens 2
 Shalimar Enclave
 Shakti Enclave
 Solitaire Divine
 Sushma Green Vista
 Sushma Elite Cross
 Sushma Crescent
 Sushma Urban Views
 The Hermitage Park

Gurdwara Shri Baoli Sahib Ji
Gurdwara Baoli Sahib is situated in Dhakoli Village, Zirakpur, in Mohali District. On his way back to Shri Anandpur Sahib after winning the Battle of Bhangani near Paonta Sahib, Shri Guru Gobind Singh Ji reached the outskirts of dhakoli. As this village was laid down by Bhai Gurditta, elder son of Shri Guru Hargobind, there were many Sikhs in the village.

References

External links
 historicalgurudwaras

Villages in Sahibzada Ajit Singh Nagar district